Mind Tricks is the third full-length studio album by the Italian melodic death metal band Disarmonia Mundi, released on June 12, 2006, by Scarlet Records. This album again features Björn "Speed" Strid on vocals, but this time without their bassist Mirco Andreis, who decided to leave the band to concentrate on his career as a video clip director. Mirco directed the video for the song "Celestial Furnace", but this time did not appear in the video. The album features a Pantera cover version of the song, "Mouth for War". The Japanese release of the album includes a bonus track from a 2002 demo entitled, "Moon of Glass". The Korean release included a bonus track entitled "Chester". The cover art features a manipulated image from the 2005 film Sin City featuring actress Makenzie Vega as Nancy Callahan.

Track listing
 "Resurrection Code" – 4:25
 "Mindtricks" – 3:52
 "Celestial Furnace" – 3:48
 "Nihilistic Overdrive" – 4:51
 "Parting Ways" – 4:01
 "Venom Leech and the Hands of Rain" – 5:03
 "Liquid Wings" – 4:36
 "Process of Annihilation" – 3:44
 "Last Breed" – 3:37
 "A Taste of Collapse" – 3:33
 "Mouth for War" (Pantera Cover) – 3:52

Bonus tracks

Release dates

Credits

Disarmonia Mundi
 Ettore Rigotti − rhythm guitar, drums, keyboards, clean vocals, music, arrangements, mixing, recording, engineering, lead guitar (4-6, 8, 9, 13, 15), bass (on every song except "Moon of Glass" and "Chester")
 Claudio Ravinale − co-lead screamed vocals and lyrics (2-11, 13, 15)
 Björn "Speed" Strid − session co-lead growl vocals & clean vocals (except on "Ringside Seat to Human Tragedy", "Moon of Glass" and "Chester")

Additionnel personnel

Musical Guests
Claudio Strazzullo - lead guitar (1-3, 7, 10, 11)
Samantha Abbatangelo - backing vocals (6), cover artwork, layout, art direction and design
Christian Älvestam - co-vocals (13)
Neroargento - remix (15)
Benny Bianco Chinto - backing vocals (1), vocals on "Moon of Glass" & "Chester"
Simone Palermiti - guitar on "Moon of Glass"
Mirco Andreis	- bass on "Moon of Glass" & "Chester"
Yoko Hallelujah - backing vocals (15)

Other personnel
Pantera - songwriting (11)
Alessandro Vanara - mastering and mixing
奥野高久 (Takahisa Okuno) - liner notes
Guido Suardi - band photography
Federico Cagliero - guitars, songwriting on "Chester"
Mike Pognant Gros - cover artwork, layout, art direction and design

References

External links
 Disarmonia Mundi discography
 "Celestial Furnace"  – Directed by Mirco Andreis

Disarmonia Mundi albums
2006 albums
Scarlet Records albums